The 1921–22 Ljubljana Subassociation League was the third season of the Ljubljana Subassociation League. Ilirija won the league for the third season in a row, defeating I. SSK Maribor 5–1 in the final.

Celje subdivision

Ljubljana subdivision

Maribor subdivision

Semi-final

Final

References

External links
Football Association of Slovenia 

Slov
Slov
Slovenian Republic Football League seasons
football
football